Piece of My Soul is the fourth studio album by Canadian singer Garou, and his fifth album overall. After several French albums, this is Garou's first English album.

Track listing
"Stand Up" — 3:51 (Rob Thomas) prod. Peer Åström 
"Accidental" — 3:47 (Anders Wollbeck/Wayne Hector/Mattias Lindblom) prod. Peer Astrom
"Burning" — 3:20 (Anders Melander) prod. Peer Åström
"Heaven's Table" — 3:16 (Martin Sutton/Don Mescall) Peer Åström/Anders Bagge/[Vito Luprano] 
"All the Way" — 2:58 (Carl Falk/Alex Vargas/Kevin Hughes/Pierre Garand) prod. Peer Åström
"Take a Piece of My Soul" — 3:17 (Aldo Nova/Anders Barren) prod. Peer Åström/Vito Luprano/Anders Barren)
"What's the Time in NYC" — 4:19 (Ronan Hardiman/Don Mescall) prod. Peer Åström
"You and I" — 3:22 (Judie Tzuke/Lucie Silvas/Graham Kearns/Charlie Russell) prod. Peer Astrom 
"First Day of My Life" — 4:08 (Guy Chambers/Enrique Iglesias) prod. Peer Astrom/Anders Bagge/Vito Luprano 
"Nothing Else Matters" — 3:35 (Dimitri Ehrlich/Andy Marvel) prod. Peer Åström
"Back for More" — 3:44 (Kristian Lundin/Andreas Carlsson) prod. Jake Schulze/Kristian Lundin 
"Beautiful Regret" — 3:30 (Martin Sutton/Don Mescall) prod. Peer Astrom/Anders Bagge/Vito Luprano
"Coming Home" — 3:35 (Peer Åström/Aldo Nova), prod. Aldo Nova

Charts

Certifications

References

2008 albums
Garou (singer) albums
Sony Music Canada albums